Tradewinds Plantation Berhad is one of the largest oil palm and rubber plantation operators in Malaysia.

Background

The Group has a landbank of 141,430 hectares, with 77,095 hectares in Sarawak, another 11,302 hectares in Sabah, and the remaining 53,039 hectares in Peninsular Malaysia. Some 95,270 hectares or 67.3% have been developed into oil palm and rubber estates, with another 12,235 hectares or 8.6% under development. As at year end, the Group’s total remaining plantable reserves stood at 24,491 hectares, which will be developed over the next four years.

Merger

On 25 May 2004, Tradewinds (M) Berhad and Johore Tenggara Oil Palm Berhad announced the proposed merger involving fourteen of Tradewinds (M) Berhad's plantation subsidiary companies with Johore Tenggara Oil Palm Berhad. The merger was completed on 28 February 2006. Pursuant to the merger, the listing status of Johore Tenggara Oil Palm Berhad was transferred to Tradewinds Plantation Berhad which made its debut listing on the Main Board of Bursa Malaysia on 15 March 2006. Tradewinds Plantation Berhad was delisted in 2015 but remains as one of the largest oil palm and rubber plantation companies in Malaysia.

References

External links

Tradewinds Plantation Berhad (MYX: 6327), bursamalaysia.com 
Company Overview of Tradewinds Plantation Berhad, bloomberg.com

2005 establishments in Malaysia
Companies formerly listed on Bursa Malaysia
Palm oil production in Malaysia
Malaysian companies established in 2005
Privately held companies of Malaysia
Agriculture companies established in 2005